Ballistics may refer to:

Science 
 Ballistics, the science that deals with the motion, behavior, and effects of projectiles
 Forensic ballistics, the science of analyzing firearm usage in crimes
 Internal ballistics, the study of the processes accelerating a projectile
 Transition ballistics, the study of the projectile's behavior when it leaves the barrel
 External ballistics, the study of the passage of the projectile through space or the air
 Terminal ballistics, the study of the interaction of a projectile with its target
 Ballistic conduction, conduction of electricity with negligible charge scattering
 Ballistic movement of muscles in an animal

Combat 
 Ballistic missile, a missile that follows a sub-orbital flightpath
 Ballistic knife, a specialized combat knife with a detachable, self-propelled blade
 Ballistic shield, a shield meant to protect the user from bullets

Arts and media

Comics 
 Ballistic (Image Comics), a comic character of Top Cow Productions
 Ballistic (DC Comics), a DC Comic Book Character

Film 
 Ballistic: Ecks vs. Sever, a 2002 film

Literature 
 Ballistic, a 2011 novel by Mark Greaney
 Ballistics, a 2013 novel by D. W. Wilson

Video games 
 Puzz Loop, a 1998 video game by Mitchell Corporation, known as Ballistic outside Japan
 Ballistics (video game), a 2001 video game by GRIN